Jeff Vespa (born 1970) is an American photographer, known as a co-founder of WireImage and the editor-at-large of LIFE.com.

Photography career 
Vespa is most widely known for being one of nine co-founders of the photo agency website WireImage.com and its parent company MediaVast. He was also the original designer of WireImage's grid layout design. This design has now been adopted as the photo industry standard. In February 2007, MediaVast announced that it would sell to Getty Images for $207 million in an all-cash deal.

Starting in 2003, Vespa has been the official photographer of the Sundance Film Festival and the Toronto International Film Festival since 2006. In 2004, he joined forces with Paris Hilton to create a New York Times bestselling book, Confessions of an Heiress: A Tongue-in-Chic Peek Behind the Pose, which was followed the next year with Your Heiress Diary: Confess it All to Me.

Vespa was the editor-at-large of the LIFE.com from March 2009 to February 2012.

On October 2, 2012, Vespa launched Verge, a web magazine dedicated to discovering new talent.

Vespa's first coffee table book, The Art of Discovery, (Rizzoli) was released in Oct. 2014. It is a book of 100 portraits of celebrities along with quotes about an important moment of discovery in their lives.

Film career 

Vespa attended the American Film Institute Graduate Program for Producing in 1993. He produced the Lifetime Television movie Rituals in 1998, which starred Isaiah Washington and Regina King. More recently he produced, wrote and directed the 10-minute short film "Nosebleed", starring David Arquette, which could be seen on IFC and Channel 3 in France. The film had its premiere at the South By Southwest Film Festival (SXSW) in March 2008 and then screened at the 2008 Cannes Film Festival as a part of the Semaine de la Critique section. In 2018 Vespa directed his first feature, Paris Song, starring Abbie Cornish and Sanjar Madi.

Bibliography 
 The Art of Discovery (2014) - Photographed by Jeff Vespa Rizzoli 
 Confessions of an Heiress: A Tongue-in-Chic Peek Behind the Pose (2004) - Paris Hilton and Merle Ginsberg, Photographs by Jeff Vespa Fireside 
 Your Heiress Diary: Confess It All to Me (2005) - Paris Hilton and Merle Ginsberg, Photographs by Jeff Vespa Fireside 
 Party Confidential (2006) - Lara Shriftman and Elizabeth Harrison, Photographs by Jeff Vespa Bullfinch

Filmography 
 Paris Song (2018) Director
 Madame Psychosis Holds A Seance, directed by Rosson Crow (2015) Producer
 Face In The Crowd, directed by Alex Prager (2013) Producer
 Sellebrity, directed by Kevin Mazur (2012) Producer
 La Petite Mort, directed by Alex Prager (2012) Producer
 Despair, directed by Alex Prager (2010) Producer
 Children of the Spider (2010) Producer, Writer and Director
 Nosebleed (2008) Producer, Writer and Director
 Rituals (1998) Producer
 Tendrils (1996) Producer

Exhibits 
 wünderarts Amherst, MA, 2008 - American Dream, Two Person Show
 Flinn Gallery Greenwich, CT, 2008 - Food...Glorious Food, Group Show
 Gallery at LoFi, LA, 2006 - Eat Me! Yummy New Photographs
 LAXART, LA, 2006 - One Shot: 100x100, Group Show
 Rush Arts Gallery, NY, 2006 - God Complex: Images Of Power, Group Show
 Traction 811, LA, 2004 - Hollywood Graffiti

References

Sources 
 https://www.hollywoodreporter.com/rambling-reporter/wireimage-founder-make-directorial-debut-920067
 https://www.hollywoodreporter.com/news/wireimage-founder-jeff-vespa-launches-753128
 https://www.hollywoodreporter.com/gallery/celebrity-photographer-jeff-vespa-debuts-741073/1-shailene-woodley
 https://www.rottentomatoes.com/m/cannes_film_festival_2008/news/1728420/
 http://www.photoinduced.com/archives/819
 http://weblogs.variety.com/thompsononhollywood/2007/09/wireimages-jeff.html?query=%22jeff+vespa%22
 http://www.simonsays.com/content/destination.cfm?tab=1&pid=501751
 http://www.imaginginfo.com/article/article.jsp?id=1314
 http://www.abouttheimage.com/2006/12/wireimage_delta_air_lines_operating_celebrity_portrait_studio_at_sundance_film_festival.html
 https://www.variety.com/article/VR1117955640.html?categoryid=2178&cs=1
 http://select.nytimes.com/gst/abstract.html?res=F30D10F9385B0C768CDDA80994DE404482

External links 
Art of Discovery
 Verge
 Official website
 Jeff Vespa blog
 LIFE.com
 
 WireImage

1970 births
Living people
American photographers
AFI Conservatory alumni